The 1832 United States presidential election in Connecticut took place between November 2 and December 5, 1832, as part of the 1832 United States presidential election. Voters chose eight representatives, or electors to the Electoral College, who voted for president and vice president.

Connecticut voted for the National Republican candidate, Henry Clay, over the Democratic Party candidate, Andrew Jackson and the Anti-Masonic Party candidate, William Wirt. Clay won Connecticut by a margin of 20.97%.

Results

See also
 United States presidential elections in Connecticut

References

Connecticut
1832
1832 Connecticut elections